"By Your Side" is a song from Scottish singer-songwriter Jimmy Somerville, released as the third and final single from his 1995 album, Dare to Love. The song was written and produced by Matt Rowe, Somerville and Richard Stannard.

Background
The song was released as the follow-up single to the two previous singles from the album; "Heartbeat" and "Hurt So Good". Both of the songs had entered the UK Top 25, whilst "By Your Side" peaked at #41. The song had debuted as its peak position before dropping to #75 the following week. The song lasted two weeks in the Top 100.

In 1996, a live version of the song appeared on the promotional European album Coca-Cola Planet Live!, released via Austereo MCM. In 2009, Somerville released the studio album "Suddenly Last Summer" which featured Somerville performing interpretations of his favorite tracks, picked from his own iPod playlist. On the stripped-down acoustic covers album, a new version of "By Your Side" was included.

Release
The single was released in the UK and Europe only, on 12" vinyl and CD via London Records. The CD release of the single featured "By Your Side (Radio Edit)" as the featured track, whilst three other songs were added. The song "Nothing Said, Nothing Done" was written by Gary Butcher and Somerville, whilst Chuck Norman and Gary Wilkinson produced the track. It was exclusive to the single until 2012 when it was included as a bonus track on the Edsel Records deluxe edition of Dare to Love. The other two tracks were "By Your Side (The Shining Mix)", remixed by Biff & Memphis (Rowe and Stannard under a pseudonym), and "By Your Side (Miss You Like Crazy Mix)", which was remixed by Space Kittens. The two remixes last over seven minutes each.

The 12" vinyl release featured "By Your Side (The Shining Mix)" as the main track, which was remixed by Rowe and Stannard, whilst the B-side was "By Your Side (Miss You Like Crazy Mix)". In the UK, a promotional 12" vinyl was also issued which featured the same tracks as the main 12" vinyl release.

The single featured artwork with photography by Donald Christie. The artwork featured Somerville standing in tall grass during the night with his arms wide as he looks up to the sky. The sleeve design was created by Andrew Biscomb and Peter Barrett who also designed the Dare to Love' album artwork.

Following the song's original release on the Dare to Love album and as a single, it has also appeared on the 2009 Music Club Deluxe compilation For a Friend: The Best of Bronski Beat, The Communards & Jimmy Somerville.

Promotion
Like the Dare to Love album's other single releases, the "By Your Side" single had a music video produced to promote it. The video did not feature Somerville.

Critical reception
In the American CMJ New Music Monthly of September 1995, a review of the Dare to Love album by writer Steven Stolder stated, "'By Your Side' matches a hip-hop tempo with mid-period Beatles-esque pop, and so on."

Jon O'Brien of AllMusic spoke of the song in a review of the 2009 album Suddenly Last Summer'' stated, Now for the first time in his 27-year career, Somerville dedicates a whole album to interpretations of his favorite tracks, which includes artists as diverse as Deep Purple, Patsy Cline, and '80s gothic minimalists Cranes, as well as one of his own compositions, the 1995 single "By Your Side." Inspired by an acoustic tour of Sydney and Melbourne, his follow-up to 2005's Home Again, Suddenly Last Summer, focuses on a stripped-down vibe, often with just an acoustic guitar or grand piano accompanying Somerville's signature crotch-grabbing vocals.

Track listing
 12" Vinyl Single
"By Your Side (The Shining Mix)" - 7:57
"By Your Side (Miss You Like Crazy Mix)" - 7:33

 12" Vinyl Single (UK promo)
"By Your Side (The Shining Mix)" - 7:56
"By Your Side (Miss You Like Crazy Mix)" - 7:33

 CD Single
"By Your Side (Radio Edit)" - 4:43
"Nothing Said, Nothing Done" - 4:29
"By Your Side (The Shining Mix)" - 7:57
"By Your Side (Miss You Like Crazy Mix)" - 7:33

Charts

Personnel
 Lead vocals on "By Your Side" - Jimmy Somerville
 Keyboards, Programming on "By Your Side" – Matt Rowe, Richard Stannard
 Strings on "By Your Side" – Sian Bell, Sonia Slany 
 Producers of "By Your Side" - Jimmy Somerville, Richard Stannard, Matt Rowe
 Additional production and remixing on "By Your Side" - Mike "Spike" Drake, Stephen Hague
 Engineers on "By Your Side" – Adrian Bushby, Henry Binns, Paul Gomersall, Sam Hardaker, Simon Gogerly
 Producers of "Nothing Said, Nothing Done" – Chuck Norman, Gary Wilkinson 
 Remixers of "By Your Side (The Shining Mix)" - Biff & Memphis (Matt Rowe, Richard Stannard)
 Remixers of "By Your Side (Miss You Like Crazy Mix)" - Space Kittens
 Photography - Donald Christie
 Sleeve Design – Andrew Biscomb, Peter Barrett
 Writers of "By Your Side" - Matt Rowe, Jimmy Somerville, Richard Stannard
 Writers of "Nothing Said, Nothing Done" - Jimmy Somerville, Gary Butcher

References

1995 singles
Jimmy Somerville songs
London Records singles
1995 songs
Songs written by Matt Rowe (songwriter)
Songs written by Richard Stannard (songwriter)
Songs written by Jimmy Somerville
Number-one singles in Israel